The 2010–11 season was Brechin City's fifth consecutive season in the Scottish Second Division, having been relegated from the Scottish First Division at the end of the 2005–06 season. Brechin also competed in the Challenge Cup, League Cup and the Scottish Cup.

Summary
Dumbarton finished fourth in the Second Division, entering the play-offs losing 3–2 to Ayr United on aggregate in the final and remained in the Second Division. They reached the first of the Scottish Challenge Cup, the third round of the League Cup and the Quarter-final of the Scottish Cup.

Management
Brechin City were managed by Jim Weir, following the resignation of Jim Duffy at the end of the previous season.

Results and fixtures

Scottish Second Division

First Division play-offs

Scottish Challenge Cup

Scottish League Cup

Scottish Cup

Player statistics

Squad 

|}

League table

Notes
Note1.  Includes other competitive competitions, including Challenge Cup and First Division play-offs

References

Brechin City F.C. seasons
Brechin City